The 2020 Iowa State Senate elections took place as part of the biennial 2020 United States state legislative elections. Iowa voters elected state senators in half of the state senate's districts – the 25 even-numbered state senate districts. State senators serve four-year terms in the Iowa Senate, with half of the seats up for election each cycle.

A statewide map of the 50 state Senate districts in the 2020 elections is provided by the Iowa General Assembly here.

The primary election on June 2, 2020, determined which candidates appeared on the November 3 general election ballot. The filing deadline was March 13.

Following the previous election in 2018, Republicans retained control of the Iowa Senate with 32 seats to Democrats' 18 seats. To reclaim control of the chamber from Republicans, the Democrats needed to net eight Senate seats.

Republicans retained control of the Iowa Senate following the 2020 general election, with the balance of power remaining unchanged.

Predictions

Summary of results
NOTE: The 25 odd-numbered districts did not hold elections in 2020 so they are not listed here.

Source:

Closest races 
Seats where the margin of victory was under 10%:
  gain

Detailed Results
Reminder: Only even-numbered Iowa Senate seats were up for election in 2020; therefore, odd-numbered seats were not having elections in 2020 & are not shown.

Note: If a district does not list a primary, then that district did not having a competitive primary (i.e., there may have only been one candidate file for that district).

District 2

District 4

District 6

District 8

District 10

District 12

District 14

District 16

District 18

District 20

District 22

District 24

District 26

District 28

District 30

District 32

District 34

District 36

District 38

District 40

District 42

District 44

District 46

District 48

District 50

See also
 2020 Iowa elections
 2020 United States House of Representatives elections in Iowa
 Elections in Iowa
 2020 United States elections

References

External links
 
 Map of State Senate districts in 2020

Senate
Iowa Senate elections
Iowa Senate